The women's marathon was one of the road events at the 1991 World Championships in Athletics in Tokyo, Japan. It took place on 25 August 1991; the course started and finished at the National Stadium. The race was won by Poland's Wanda Panfil in 2:29:53, ahead of Sachiko Yamashita of Japan in second and Germany's Katrin Dörre in third.

Final ranking

See also
 1988 Women's Olympic Marathon (Seoul)
 1990 Women's European Championships Marathon (Split)
 1992 Women's Olympic Marathon (Barcelona)
 1994 Women's European Championships Marathon (Helsinki)

References

M
Marathons at the World Athletics Championships
World Championships
Women's marathons
World Championships in Athletics marathon
Marathons in Japan

nl:IAAF wereldkampioenschap marathon 1991